Aserrí is a district of the Aserrí canton, in the San José province of Costa Rica.

Geography 
Aserrí has an area of  km² and an elevation of  metres.

Demographics 

For the 2011 census, Aserrí had a population of  inhabitants.

Transportation

Road transportation 
The district is covered by the following road routes:
 National Route 209
 National Route 217
 National Route 312

References 

Districts of San José Province
Populated places in San José Province